Satheerth Kunneth, better known by his stage name DJ Shadow Dubai, is a Disc jockey, and Record producer currently residing in Dubai. He came into limelight after his song Slowly Slowly in collaboration with Guru Randhawa and Pitbull (rapper) became popular on YouTube with 200+ million views on YouTube.

Career
Shadow began his career at the early age, by Producing Tracks and performing in clubs, and later he started remixing official tracks for different Bollywood artists like Yo Yo Honey Singh, Arijit Singh, Diljit Dosanjh and many others across India which gained him popularity.

Discography

Official Remixes

Awards and recognition 
 In the year 2018 Dj shadow won the Best Dj award at the Masala Award
 Got mentioned in the Guinness Book of World Records for having participated in the World's Biggest DJ Rally.

References

Living people
21st-century Indian musicians
Indian DJs
Progressive house musicians
Indian electronic musicians
Electronic dance music DJs
Year of birth missing (living people)